Francisco Álvarez Martínez (14 July 1925 – 5 January 2022) was a Spanish prelate of the Catholic Church who was archbishop of Toledo from 1995 to 2002. He was bishop of Tarazona from 1973 to 1976, of Calahorra y La Calzada-Logroño from 1976 to 1989, and of Orihuela-Alicante from 1989 to 1995. He was created a cardinal in 2001.

Biography
Álvarez Martínez was born in the parish of Santa Eulalia de Ferroñes in Llanera, Asturias, on 14 July 1925. He studied at the seminary in Oviedo and was ordained a priest of the Archdiocese of Oviedo on 11 June 1950. He served as the archbishop's secretary from 1950 to 1956 and was chancellor of the archdiocese from 1957 to 1969. He studied canon law at the Pontifical University of Salamanca from 1955 to 1958 and then earned a doctorate in canon law from the Pontifical University of Comillas in 1962.

He was appointed bishop of Tarazona on 13 April 1973 by Pope Paul VI. He was consecrated by Luigi Dadaglio, Apostolic Nuncio to Spain, assisted by Pedro Cantero Cuadrado, Archbishop of Zaragoza, and José Méndez Asensio, Archbishop of Pamplona. He was transferred to the see of Calahora y La Calzada-Logroño on 20 December 1976 and then to the see of Orihuela-Alicante on 12 May 1989. He was appointed Metropolitan Archbishop of Toledo on 23 June 1995.

He was made Cardinal Priest of Santa Maria Regina Pacis a Monte Verde in the consistory of 21 February 2001 by Pope John Paul II.

Pope John Paul accepted his resignation as Archbishop of Toledo on 24 October 2002. Three months before his 80th birthday, Álvarez Martínez was one of the cardinal electors who participated in the 2005 papal conclave that elected Pope Benedict XVI.

Álvarez Martínez died in a Madrid hospital after a long illness on 5 January 2022, at the age of 96.

References

External links
 
 Cardinal Álvarez Martínez
 Catholic-Hierarchy.org Profile

1925 births
2022 deaths
21st-century Spanish cardinals
Archbishops of Toledo
Bishops of Tarazona
Cardinals created by Pope John Paul II
People from Llanera, Asturias